Wierzchowiny  is a village in the administrative district of Gmina Siennica Różana, within Krasnystaw County, Lublin Voivodeship, in eastern Poland.

World War II

Wierzchowiny was the location of a massacre carried out by a National Armed Forces unit commanded by Mieczysław Pazderski on 6 June 1945 in which approximately 50–196 inhabitants of the village (mostly Ukrainian, but also Polish) were killed in what remains an aura of considerable controversy.

References

Wierzchowiny